Wondunna is a suburb of Hervey Bay in the Fraser Coast Region, Queensland, Australia. In the  Wondunna had a population of 2,677 people.

History 
The suburb was named after Willie Wondunna, an Aboriginal man born on Fraser Island, who was sent to Victoria to track the Kelly Gang in 1880. His alternate tribal name was Caboonya.

Fraser Coast Anglican College opened on 1995.

In the  Wondunna had a population of 2,677 people.

Education 
Fraser Coast Anglican College is a private primary and secondary (Prep-12) school for boys and girls at Doolong South Road. In 2018, the school had an enrolment of 642 students with 48 teachers (45 full-time equivalent) and 41 non-teaching staff (32 full-time equivalent).

Amenities 
St John's Anglican Church is at 2-8 Gilston Street (corner of Doolong Road).

References 

Fraser Coast Region